Aaron Spencer Feld (January 5, 1891 – March 24, 1987) was an American lawyer and politician from New York.

Life
He was born on January 5, 1891, in New York City.

Feld was a member of the New York State Assembly (New York Co., 23rd D.) in 1925 and 1926.

He was a member of the New York State Senate (20th D.) from 1927 to 1940, sitting in the 150th, 151st, 152nd, 153rd, 154th, 155th, 156th, 157th, 158th, 159th, 160th, 161st and 162nd New York State Legislatures. He was Chairman of the Senate Committee on Public Education from 1933 to 1938; and in 1934 succeeded J. Griswold Webb as Chairman of the Special Joint Legislative Committee on Aviation.

In 1942, Feld was disbarred by the New York Supreme Court, Appellate Division.

He died on March 24, 1987; and was buried at the Los Angeles National Cemetery.

References

External links

1891 births
1987 deaths
Democratic Party New York (state) state senators
People from Manhattan
Democratic Party members of the New York State Assembly
Disbarred American lawyers
Burials at Los Angeles National Cemetery
20th-century American politicians